1st Street is an east–west thoroughfare in Los Angeles, East Los Angeles, and Monterey Park, California.  It serves as a postal divider between north and south and is one of a few streets to run across the Los Angeles River. Though it serves as a major road east of downtown Los Angeles, it is a mostly residential street to the west.

For over a mile between Hoover Street and Glendale Boulevard, 1st Street is synonymous with Beverly Boulevard.

Transportation
The L Line runs on east 1st Street between Alameda and Indiana Streets; it operates the Little Tokyo/Arts District, Pico/Aliso, Mariachi Plaza, Soto and Indiana stations. Metro Local line 14 runs through west 1st Street and Metro Local line 30 through East 1st Street. The under construction Metro Regional Connector will have a new light rail subway station on the intersection of 1st Street and Central Avenue. There's also another Metro Rail station at Hill Street which is Civic Center/Grand Park, served by Metro's B and D lines.

Film history
First Street was a location background filmed during the movie Blood In Blood Out (originally: Bound by Honor).

Downtown bridges
Walking through these historic bridges in Downtown Los Angeles from 1910 to the 1930s had been a leisure and pastime for some people. In the book Down by the Los Angeles River, written by Joe Linton, the author narrates a walking path starting from First Street Bridge.
LA voters in 1924 passed the Viaduct Bond Act, which would allocate $2 million through a tax, and the funds allocated would go toward revitalizing the Downtown Los Angeles bridges. The friends of the Los Angeles River mobilized the La Gran Limpieza to clean up the Los Angeles River with an educational feature where they invited elementary, middle, and high school students. A collaboration the friends of the Los Angeles had was with the Los Angeles Conservation Corps’ Clean & Green program that monitored the water quality at the rivers monthly. Under their collaborated event efforts, activities included cleaning up trash, science experiments, educational workshop, and familiarizing participants with the Los Angeles River bridges themselves since events would be facilitated there to create community identity.

Notable landmarks
Monterey Park Village (eastern terminus)
Beverly Center (western terminus)
CBS West Coast Headquarters
Disney Concert Hall
Grand Park
Los Angeles City Hall
Caltrans District 7 Headquarters
Little Tokyo
Mariachi Plaza
The intersection of East 1st and Chicago streets in Boyle Heights is named Dolores Huerta Square.

References

External links

Streets in Los Angeles
Central Los Angeles
Downtown Los Angeles
Civic Center, Los Angeles
Eastside Los Angeles